George Mills (1792/93 – 28 January 1824) was a British sculptor, engraver and medallist.

Mills exhibited at the Royal Academy of Arts from 1816-1823 and gained three gold medals from the Royal Society of Arts. He produced a number of coin patterns while employed at the Soho Mint. Some of his works can be found at the National Maritime Museum and the British Museum. He died in 1824.

References

British medallists
British sculptors
British male sculptors
British engravers
1792 births
1824 deaths